There are two species of skink named Chinese blue-tailed skink:

 Plestiodon chinensis, native to China and Vietnam
 Plestiodon leucostictus, native to Taiwan